Henry Mower Rice is a marble sculpture of Henry Mower Rice created by Frederick Triebel and placed in the National Statuary Hall Collection in the Capitol Building in Washington, D.C., one of the two statues there from the State of Minnesota.  It was dedicated in 1916.  The work cost $7,500 and was unveiled in Washington on February 8, 1916.

See also
 1916 in art

References

External links
 

1916 establishments in Washington, D.C.
1916 sculptures
Bronze sculptures in Washington, D.C.
Monuments and memorials in Washington, D.C.
Rice, Henry Mower
Sculptures of men in Washington, D.C.